is a video game character in the Tekken video game series by Namco Bandai Games. Introduced in Tekken 5 in 2004, Asuka is a brash and hot-headed Japanese teenager who is best known for her archrivalry with fellow teenager Lili. Through her father, she is also related to both Jun Kazama and her son, Jin Kazama, although these relationships are rarely touched upon in the series. Appearing in every installment of the series since Tekken 5, Asuka has received a positive reception from critics and fans, and is often seen as one of the most popular characters in the series. Asuka has a summer version named Summer Asuka who was first introduced in Tekken Mobile. Summer Asuka has the same fighting style and Rage Art as Asuka.

Appearances

In video games
Asuka's official story states that she was taught Kazama-style traditional martial arts by her father, a dojo-master near Osaka, ever since she was a small girl. By nature, Asuka believes very strongly in justice and devotes much of her free time to being a "pacifist" vigilante who is breaking up fights. At the time in which the game takes place, Asuka is 17 years old and is a high school student. Asuka returned home from school one day to find that her dojo was in shambles. The students there had been beaten severely and her father was so badly hurt that he had to be taken to the hospital. In the next several days, a detective from Hong Kong, Lei Wulong, came to her and explained that the culprit would likely be entering The King of Iron Fist Tournament 5. In order to get her personal revenge and redeem her dojo, Asuka enters the tournament as well. In the tournament, Asuka managed to beat a Monegasque teenager, Lili, causing a bitter rivalry between the two (although most of the conflicts mainly start from Lili's side). However, she was unable to find Feng Wei, and, as the tournament ended, she returned to her calm and normal life. Her life did not stay peaceful for long though, as Asuka discovered that the man responsible for the terrible war going on all over the world, Jin Kazama, is a relative. She enters The King of Iron Fist Tournament 6 in order to capture Jin. However, due to Lili keeps getting in her way, an annoyed Asuka needs to take her down first in The King of Iron Fist Tournament 7.

Asuka also appears in the non-canonical games Tekken Tag Tournament 2, Tekken 3D: Prime Edition and Tekken Revolution. Outside of the series, she appears as a playable character in the crossover game Street Fighter X Tekken where her official tag partner is Lili. According to backstory for Steam and Xbox Live Marketplace downloadable content (DLC) ninja costume swap for Asuka, she traveled to Street Fighter'''s Ibuki's village to learn the ninja arts from her.

Design and gameplay
Asuka has a brash and arrogant personality, traits that other Kazamas in the series lacked. Though her profile states that she breaks up fights regularly ("by knockout", as added in the game's prologue), she seems to enjoy fighting herself. In her story mode, after defeating her target (Feng Wei), she decides to remain at the tournament in order to "have fun". Her pre- and post-match quotes demonstrate her confidence. Asuka speaks Japanese with a very heavy Kansai region accent.

In Tekken 5 and Tekken 5: Dark Resurrection, Asuka's default outfit (in which she is usually portrayed in official art and CG renders) is a blue halter top and bluish white short shorts (changed to red and black respectively in Dark Resurrection), with matching motorcycle and elbow protectors. Her secondary costume is a more traditional Jujutsu uniform with gi top, hakama, fingerless gauntlets and matching instep guards. In the PS2 version of Tekken 5 and the PSP version of Dark Resurrection, she gains two extra outfits. One is a Japanese parochial schoolgirl uniform with a yellow sweater vest and pleated skirt, seen during both her intro and her prologue. The other is a visual kei geisha-like outfit with high-heel sandals. In Tekken 6, Asuka retains her default costumes from Dark Resurrection, including the school uniform but excluding the geisha costume. Her Tekken 7 default costume is a matsuri outfit, composed of a vest with decorative cords and a bra top, sarashi (cloth-wrap shorts) and open-toed, boot-like sandals.

Asuka fights in the "Kazama-style Traditional Martial Arts" discipline, which is the same style that is used by her relative Jun Kazama. According to PSU.com, Asuka "isn’t quite the brawler" Lili is, but her style "is both confusing and surprisingly damaging." She can be considered a replacement of Jun (who, aside from the upcoming Tekken 8, hasn’t made a canonical appearance since Tekken 2) in recent instalments, as she inherits most of her attacks with several more added to better fit her character. When Jun returns in Tekken Tag Tournament 2, Asuka retains her moveset while Jun gains a new one (although the two still share several moves with each other).

Other appearances

Asuka's dossier is briefly seen in the CGI film Tekken: Blood Vengeance when Anna Williams opens a file containing dossiers on various people of interest. A live-action Asuka is featured in the Spike Video Game Awards 2011 trailer for the console versions of Tekken Tag Tournament 2 where she, Lili, Kazuya Mishima and Bryan Fury are all fighting each other. A live-action Asuka, portrayed by Vivian Nguyen, appears in the Tekken Tag Tournament 2 "Girl Power" trailer, shown at San Diego Comic-Con International 2012.

An official statuette of Asuka was released by Namco in the Tekken 5 series. Licensed figures of the character were also released by Tomytec in 2005, by Yujin in 2006 (two different), and by Kotobukiya in 2012 (including a limited edition). The manga Tekken Comic has Asuka and Lili as the main protagonists. Asuka appears as a Spirit in the Nintendo crossover video game Super Smash Bros. Ultimate.

Reception
Eurogamer praised Asuka for not being "your stereotypical Japanese schoolgirl. Instead, she's a wisecracking bitch of a bully with the guts to beat anyone. And, she doesn't giggle. Ever." In 2007, UGO Networks ranked her as eleventh in the list of "video game hotties". Complex listed Asuka as one of top ten "hottest game girls" in 2009, also featuring her in their 2012 lists of the Tekken series' craziest moments and the most humiliating victory quotes in fighting games.Obi Anyanwu, The 100 Most Humiliating Video Game Victory Quotes, Complex.com, November 14, 2012. In 2012, PlayStation Universe included Asuka and Lili among the top five rival pairs of Tekken Tag Team Tournament 2 "who simply can’t stand each other, but nevertheless make for quite a devastating combination" when chosen together for a tag team. She was ranked as the 92nd best looking game girl by GameHall's Portal PlayGame in 2015 and as the number one most sexy Oriental character by the Indonesian television Liputan 6 in 2015.

In GamesRadar article for Street Fighter X Tekken, they stated "A Japanese high school student/learned martial artist, most of her cutscenes and dialogue are fairly lighthearted, played mostly for comic relief compared to Jin and Jun’s family drama." Asuka was the fourth most requested Tekken character in an official poll by Namco Bandai Games asking who should be added to the roster of Tekken X Street Fighter, racking up 13.50% of votes.  

Writer Dai Sato expressed interest in doing a Tekken'' film starring Asuka and Lili as main characters.

See also
List of Tekken characters

References

External links

Female characters in video games
Fictional aikidoka
Fictional martial artists in video games
Fictional female martial artists
Fictional female ninja
Fictional Japanese people in video games
Fictional characters from Kansai
Fictional kyūjutsuka
Fictional pacifists
Fictional tessenjutsuka
Ninja characters in video games
Teenage characters in video games
Tekken characters
Woman soldier and warrior characters in video games
Video game characters introduced in 2004
Vigilante characters in video games